Nicholas Suzuki (born August 10, 1999) is a Canadian professional ice hockey centre and captain of the Montreal Canadiens of the National Hockey League (NHL). The Vegas Golden Knights selected him in the first round, 13th overall, of the 2017 NHL Entry Draft.

Early life 
Suzuki was born on August 10, 1999, in London, Ontario, to parents Rob and Amanda Suzuki. He suffered from several health conditions as a child, including hand, foot, and mouth disease, several bouts of pneumonia due to respiratory syncytial virus, and recurrent ear infections, the latter of which required surgery to insert tympanostomy tubes. Suzuki's health improved as he grew older, and he began ice skating at the age of three. He befriended his neighbour Isaac Ratcliffe, and the two began playing sports together when they were eight: ice hockey in the winter, and golf and soccer in the summer. Suzuki and Ratcliffe went on to play minor ice hockey together for the London Jr. Knights, where they took the team to the semifinals in the OHL Cup. After leading the league with 34 goals and 68 points in 31 games, Suzuki was named the Alliance Hockey Player of the Year for the 2014–15 season.

Playing career

Amateur

Owen Sound Attack (2015–2018)

The Owen Sound Attack of the Ontario Hockey League (OHL) drafted Suzuki in the first round, 14th overall, of the 2015 OHL Priority Selection, and he signed with the team that June. Suzuki made an immediate impact on the Attack, with two goals and one assist through the first three games of the 2015–16 season. This included his first career junior ice hockey goal against the Kitchener Rangers on September 25. After finishing the first half of his rookie season with an overtime goal against the London Knights, Suzuki scored his first OHL hat-trick on January 30, when Owen Sound defeated the Ottawa 67's 5–2. Suzuki scored his 20th goal of the year in the last regular-season game, a 7–3 loss to Kitchener, becoming the first Attack rookie to score 20 goals in his 16-year-old season since Joey Hishon in 2008. He finished the year with 38 points in 63 games and was the only 16-year-old in the OHL to score 20 or more goals. He added two more goals in six postseason games before the Knights eliminated Owen Sound in the first round. At the end of the season, Suzuki was named to the OHL First All-Rookie Team at centre.

Entering the 2016–17 season, Suzuki, who had a goal and an assist in his first four games, was named a Player to Watch by the NHL Central Scouting Bureau. By mid-December, Suzuki was eighth in the OHL with 43 points and had already tied his previous season high of 20 goals. He was subsequently named to Team Cherry at the 2017 CHL/NHL Top Prospects Game. He was the top-ranked member of the Attack in the NHL Central Scouting Bureau's mideterm report, named the number 16 North American skating prospect. Suzuki moved up to 10th in the final Central Scouting Rankings after ending the regular season with 45 goals and 96 points in 65 games. He added an additional eight goals and 23 points in 17 postseason games as the Attack reached the OHL Western Conference Finals, where they were eliminated by the Erie Otters in six games. At the end of his sophomore season, Suzuki was named to the OHL All-Star Second Team, and he also received both the William Hanley Trophy and the CHL Sportsman of the Year award after recording only 10 penalty minutes in 65 games. That June, the Vegas Golden Knights of the National Hockey League (NHL) selected Suzuki in the first round, 13th overall of the 2017 NHL Entry Draft, and he signed a three-year, entry-level contract with the team on July 15.

The Golden Knights invited Suzuki to their  preseason training camp before returning him to Owen Sound on September 22. Upon his return, Suzuki was named an assistant captain for the Attack. Suzuki recorded several milestones over the course of the 2017–18 season. On February 3, he registered his 200th OHL point with an assist on Kevin Hancock's goal against the Kitchener Rangers. His 100th OHL goal came on March 10, in a 3–0 win over the Saginaw Spirit. One week later, Suzuki earned his 100th point of the season, scoring two goals and recording an assist against the Sarnia Sting. He became the fifth Attack player in history to record a 100-point season, and the first since Bobby Ryan during the 2006–07 season. Suzuki finished his third OHL season with 42 goals and 58 assists in 64 games, and he was awarded his second consecutive William Hanley Trophy after recording only 18 penalty minutes during the season.

Owen Sound began the 2018 OHL playoffs with a first-round sweep of the London Knights, during which Suzuki recorded one goal and six points. They were eliminated the following round after pushing the Sault Ste. Marie Greyhounds to seven games, and Suzuki finished the postseason with three goals and 12 points in 11 games. After his OHL season concluded, the Golden Knights assigned Suzuki to the Chicago Wolves, their American Hockey League (AHL) affiliate, for the team's Calder Cup run. The Rockford IceHogs swept the Wolves in the first round of playoffs, and Suzuki made a brief appearance in the final game of the series.

Guelph Storm (2018–2019)
On September 10, 2018, the Golden Knights traded Suzuki, as well as Tomáš Tatar and a second-round pick in the 2019 NHL Entry Draft, to the Montreal Canadiens in exchange for veteran forward Max Pacioretty. He attended training camp with the Canadiens before returning to Owen Sound for the 2018–19 season as captain of the Attack. After scoring 22 goals and 45 points through the first 30 OHL games of the season, Suzuki was part of another trade on January 9, 2019. Owen Sound sent Suzuki, Zachary Roberts, and Sean Durzi to the Guelph Storm in exchange for forwards Zachary Pointer and Barret Kirwin, defenceman Mark Woolley, and draft picks in the next four OHL Priority Selections. On February 20, Suzuki recorded his 300th career OHL point with an assist on Dmitri Samorukov's game-winning overtime goal against the Flint Firebirds. A natural centre, Suzuki spent more time on the right wing after the trade. He was moved back to centre at the end of February, with Nate Schnarr and Isaac Ratcliffe on his wings. This line proved quickly successful, combining for 19 goals and 48 points in a six-game span, including five goals and 20 points from Suzuki. He scored 12 goals and recorded 49 points in 29 games following the midseason trade, finishing the season with 34 goals and 94 points in 59 games between the two teams. Suzuki was named to the 2018–19 OHL All-Star Third Team, and he received his third consecutive William Hanley Trophy for recording 12 penalty minutes over the course of the season..

After sweeping the Kitchener Rangers in the first round of the 2019 OHL playoffs, during which Suzuki and Ratcliffe combined for six goals and 13 points, Guelph quickly fell into a 3–0 series deficit against the London Knights. Suzuki contributed eight points in the next three games to even the series and force a winner-take-all Game 7. After defeating the Knights, Guelph faced the Saginaw Spirit in the OHL Western Conference Finals. They came back to win the series from a 3–1 deficit, and Suzuki collected seven goals and 17 points in seven games. Facing the Ottawa 67's in Game 4 of the OHL championships, Suzuki recorded his 38th postseason point, a single-season franchise record for the Storm. Guelph won the J. Ross Robertson Cup in six games, and Suzuki, who had 16 goals and 42 points in 24 games, was received the Wayne Gretzky 99 Award as the OHL Playoff MVP. Guelph's OHL victory advanced them to the 2019 Memorial Cup, where they were defeated by the Halifax Mooseheads in a four-game semifinal series. Suzuki recorded three goals and seven points in the process, and he received the George Parsons Trophy as the tournament's most sportsmanlike player. Suzuki finished his junior ice hockey career with 141 goals and 328 points in four seasons with Owen Sound and Guelph.

Professional

2019–2022

After making an impression on general manager Marc Bergevin during training camp, Suzuki was named to the Canadiens' opening-night roster for the  season. He made his NHL debut on October 4, 2019, a 4–3 shootout loss to the Carolina Hurricanes. Five days later, Suzuki assisted on Joel Armia's goal against the Buffalo Sabres to earn his first NHL point. Suzuki's first NHL goal came in his seventh career game, when he scored on Alex Stalock in a 4–0 shutout victory over the Minnesota Wild. He and Victor Mete became the first Montreal teammates to score their first career goals in the same game since Chris Higgins and Alexander Perezhogin in 2005. Alternating between centre and wing, Suzuki had seven goals and 19 points by the NHL's midseason holiday break. On February 8, 2020, Suzuki recorded his 35th point with an assist on Ilya Kovalchuk's game-winning goal against the Toronto Maple Leafs. He was the first Montreal rookie to register that many points since Higgins during the 2005–06 season. With four goals and 10 points in the month of February, including a team-leading five power play points, Suzuki was awarded the Molson Cup as Montreal's player of the month. At the time that the regular NHL season was suspended indefinitely due to the COVID-19 pandemic, Suzuki had 13 goals and 41 points in 71 games. He was one of only three players to appear in every regular-season game, and his 41 points were second to Guy Lafleur for the most of any Montreal rookie aged 20 or younger.

When the NHL returned to play for the 2020 Stanley Cup playoffs in July, Suzuki was one of 31 Canadiens selected to join the team in Toronto. He scored his first postseason NHL goal in the first game of the Stanley Cup qualifiers, putting Montreal up 2–0 in an eventual 3–2 win over the Pittsburgh Penguins. The Canadiens defeated Pittsburgh in the qualifying round and advanced to the Eastern Conference First Round, where they lost to the Philadelphia Flyers in six games. Suzuki scored four goals in the process, and his seven points in 10 games tied Jonathan Drouin for the most of any Canadien in the playoffs. At the end of the season, Suzuki was named to the 2019–20 NHL All-Rookie Team.

Starting the  season on the top offensive line with Drouin and Josh Anderson, Suzuki began the year on a six-game point streak. That early-season momentum failed to carry forward: through 18 games, the Canadiens' four centres scored only eight goals, four of which were from Suzuki. By midseason, Suzuki had 18 points in 28 games and was on an eight-game scoring drought. At the NHL trading deadline, Bergevin acquired veteran Eric Staal to act as a mentor for Suzuki and Jesperi Kotkaniemi, both of whom were struggling with consistency. Suzuki also benefited from the late-season addition of Cole Caufield, who joined the Canadiens after finishing his college ice hockey career with the Wisconsin Badgers. After Caufield set up Suzuki's game-tying goal against the Edmonton Oilers on May 12, Suzuki told reporters that the "chemistry is there" between them. Suzuki finished the regular season with 15 goals and 41 points in 56 games.

Suzuki and the Canadiens faced the Toronto Maple Leafs in the first round of the 2021 Stanley Cup playoffs. After Toronto took a 3–1 series lead, Suzuki scored the overtime Game 5 goal to extend the series. Montreal took the series in seven games, moving on to play the Winnipeg Jets in the second round. The Canadiens swept the Jets in four games, with Suzuki recording four goals and eight points through the first 11 games of the postseason. After defeating the Vegas Golden Knights in six games, Suzuki and the Canadiens faced the Tampa Bay Lightning in the 2021 Stanley Cup Finals. It was the first time a Canadian team reached the Finals since the Vancouver Canucks ten years prior. The Canadiens lost the series in five games, Suzuki finished the postseason with seven goals and 16 points in 22 games.

On October 12, 2021, Suzuki signed an eight-year, $63 million extension with the Canadiens, which would carry through the 2029–30 NHL season. He was also one of several alternate captains for Montreal during the  season. After recording four goals and ten points in 14 games, Suzuki was the Canadiens' Molson Cup pick for the month of November. On December 7, Suzuki collected his 100th career point with an assist in Montreal's 3–2 loss to the Lightning. He became the ninth-youngest skater to record 100 points with Montreal and did so in 154 games, the third-fastest of any Canadien since 1996. In January, Suzuki, who led the team with 19 points in 35 games, was named Montreal's representative for the 2022 NHL All-Star Game in Las Vegas. On February 9, the Canadiens, who were last in the league with an 8–30–7 record, fired head coach Dominique Ducharme and appointed Martin St. Louis interim coach of the organization. Shortly after his appointment, St. Louis placed Caufield and Anderson on the top line with Suzuki. In their first game together, the line combined for seven points as Montreal won 5–2 against Toronto. Suzuki's 40th point of the season came on March 5, his 12th point in a seven-game stretch. Suzuki and Caufield were both honored with the Molson Cup for March after scoring seven goals apiece in 15 games. On April 16, Suzuki scored his 20th goal of the season against the Washington Capitals, while his 60th point came on April 27 against the New York Rangers. Although Montreal failed to reach the 2022 Stanley Cup playoffs, Suzuki set career highs with 21 goals and 61 points, while his 209 consecutive games gave him the seventh-longest iron man streak among active players. At the end of the season, Suzuki was named the Canadiens' 2021–22 Molson Cup winner.

2022–present

On September 12, 2022, Suzuki succeeded Shea Weber as captain of the Canadiens. He was the 31st captain of the franchise and, at 23 years old, the youngest captain in team history. Veteran players Joel Edmundson and Brendan Gallagher were subsequently named alternate captains. Upon being named captain, several of the leading politicians in Quebec, including Coalition Avenir Québec Premier François Legault and Liberal leader Dominique Anglade urged Suzuki to learn French as a way to connect with the Montreal fans. Pittsburgh Penguins captain Sidney Crosby also privately advised him that he should do so, citing his own experience while playing with the QMJHL's Rimouski Océanic. Suzuki told reporters that he took online classes during the summer as well as French in school growing up, but acknowledged he was currently better at reading the language than speaking it.

The 2022–23 season was expected to be a development year for the rebuilding Canadiens. With Suzuki and Caufield an established duo on the team's first line, coach St-Louis began experimenting with different players in the other wing position. The early games saw Anderson, Sean Monahan and Mike Hoffman rotate through. The position was next given to Kirby Dach, the former 2019 third overall selection acquired by the Canadiens in the offseason with the initial expectation that he would play centre. The Caufield/Suzuki/Dach line generated strong initial results.

International play 
Suzuki was one of three members of the Owen Sound Attack invited to participate in the 2015 World U-17 Hockey Challenge. He won gold with the Canada White team, recording one goal and four points in six tournament games. The following year, he was named to the Canadian under-18 team roster for the 2016 Ivan Hlinka Memorial Tournament. He recorded one goal and three points in four games as Canada finished the tournament in fifth place.

As a member of the Canadian junior team, Suzuki participated in the 2019 World Junior Ice Hockey Championships in British Columbia. He provided three assists in five games, while the Canadian team was eliminated by Finland in a 2–1 quarterfinal match. It was the first time in World Junior history that Canada had hosted the tournament and not reached the medal rounds.

Personal life
Suzuki's younger brother Ryan also plays hockey. He was selected 28th overall by the Carolina Hurricanes in the 2019 NHL Entry Draft. The brothers are also distantly related to David Suzuki, a geneticist and television presenter who founded the David Suzuki Foundation. He is a first cousin of their grandfather.

Suzuki is one-quarter Japanese and is considered Gosei, as his great-great grandparents immigrated to Canada in the early 1900s. He has expressed his desire to become a role model for younger Japanese and other Asian hockey players. Suzuki is also of Scottish Canadian descent on his mother's side.

Career statistics

Regular season and playoffs

International

Awards and achievements

References

External links
 
 

1999 births
Living people
Canadian expatriate ice hockey players in the United States
Canadian ice hockey centres
Canadian sportspeople of Japanese descent
Chicago Wolves players
Guelph Storm players
Ice hockey people from Ontario
Montreal Canadiens players
National Hockey League first-round draft picks
Owen Sound Attack players
Sportspeople from London, Ontario
Vegas Golden Knights draft picks
Canadian people of Scottish descent